Eleanor Lee Kai-xin (born October 12, 1999) is a Singaporean actress, singer and model based in China. She gained popularity after starring in the romance school-based drama series, The Big Boss, where she played as Ye Mu Xi.

Early life and education
Eleanor Yu Kai-xin was born on October 12, 1999 in Taipei, Taiwan to 25-year-old Quan Yi Fong and 31-year-old . She was born by caesarean section during a aftershock of the 1999 Jiji earthquake. Just after her birth, she was adopted by Addy Lee as his goddaughter. She has two younger paternal half-brother Christian (born 2012) and Israel (born 2016). She is of Chinese descent, her mother is from Taiwan and her father has Teochew ancestry.

On January 3, 2009, her parents filed for divorce, leaving her in the custody of both parents. She was then under maternal care by her mother after her parents decided to part ways amicably. Her father and her met once a few years ago, gave each other their blessings, and decided not to keep in contact. During her 14th birthday party sponsored by Addy Lee, she announced the adoption of her godfather's surname. 

Lee was educated at Tao Nan School before studying at Nexus International School Singapore. Prior to becoming an actress, she was a model for Addyli Hair Care Product, founded by Addy Lee. In July 2017, she was admitted into Beijing Film Academy.

Career
In 2014, Apple's China branch was auditioning for someone to star as the female lead in their micro film, The Old Record, but were unable to find a suitable candidate. Addy Lee chanced upon the news, and recommended Lee to audition for the role. In the end, she was selected. When The Old Record was released on February 2, 2015, she garnered huge amount of attention from the public, and was subsequently signed to Beijing Summer Star Media Co. Ltd.

Since then, Lee was constantly involved in filming advertisements and dramas in China, and in 2015, she was chosen by Cao Dun to play the younger version of Xu Lu's character in Tribes and Empires: Storm of Prophecy. In November 2015, Lee collaborated with Wu Qiang, producing two pieces of artwork that were to be sold at $13,500 each. She then released her first song, "Noble Aspirations" with Wu Junyu, as the theme song of Noble Aspirations.

In March 2017, Lee starred as one of the leads in Solaso Bistro, based on the Japanese drama A Restaurant with Many Problems. In June 2017, she was cast as the female lead in Chinese drama, Overseas Security Officer, alongside Leon Lai. In September 2017, Lee played the female lead in the campus drama, The Big Boss. In October 2017, she released her first single, "That Girl". She continued to release two more singles the same year; "Ink Pen and Eraser", as well as self composed single titled "Be Together".

In 2018, Lee was cast in the Chinese fantasy drama My Poseidon, followed by drama Blowing in the Wind.

In 2020, Lee starred in the romance fantasy web film The Enchanting Phantom, adapted from the 1987 film A Chinese Ghost Story. She also starred in starred in the youth romance drama My Love, Enlighten Me,  and historical romance drama Fake Princess.

Filmography

Film

Television series

Accolades

Discography

References

1999 births
Living people
21st-century Singaporean actresses
21st-century Singaporean women singers
Singaporean television actresses
Singaporean film actresses
Singaporean Mandopop singers
Singaporean singer-songwriters
Singaporean female models
Singaporean people of Teochew descent
Singaporean people of Taiwanese descent
Beijing Film Academy alumni
Singaporean expatriates in China